{{DISPLAYTITLE:Phi3 Ceti}}

Phi3 Ceti is a solitary, orange-hued star in the equatorial constellation of Cetus. It is faintly visible to the naked eye with an apparent visual magnitude of 5.31. The star is drifting closer with a radial velocity of −25.5 km/s.

This is an evolved K-type giant star with a stellar classification of K5 III. It has about 1.4 times the mass and 44 times the radius of the Sun. The star radiates 441 times the solar luminosity from its photosphere at an effective temperature of 3,974 K.

References

K-type giants
Cetus (constellation)
Ceti, Phi3
BD-12 0162
Ceti, 22
004371
005437
0267